The Ministry of Special Assistance  is a ministry of the Government of Maharashtra. It is responsible for welfare, social justice and empowerment of disadvantaged and marginalized sections of society.

The Ministry is headed by a cabinet level minister. Eknath Shinde is current Chief Minister of Maharashtra and Minister of Special Assistance.

Head office

List of Cabinet Ministers

List of Ministers of State

References

Government ministries of Maharashtra